A list of notable Jewish anti-Zionist organizations.

Current and active

Historical and inactive

Europe

Middle East

North America

See also
Anti-Zionism
Bundism
Haredim and Zionism
Jewish left
Jews Against Zionism

References